Geodia carcinophila is a species of sponge in the family Geodiidae. It was first described by Lendenfeld in 1897. It is found in the waters of the Somali Sea around the Zanzibar Archipelago.

Bibliography 
 Lendenfeld, R. Von (1897) Spongien von Sansibar., Abhandlungen herausgegeben von der Senckenbergischen naturforschenden Gesellschaft 21: 93-133, pls 9-10.

References

Tetractinellida
Sponges described in 1897